Augustin Călin (born 5 August 1973) is a retired Romanian football player.

Player career
As a player, he played for several Romanian clubs such as Universitatea Craiova, Steaua București, Dinamo București and Oțelul Galați. He also played in China for Liaoning and Henan Jianye and in Italy for lower league sides Trento Calcio and Maceratese. He retired in 2006.

Honours
FC Universitatea Craiova
Cupa României: 1992–93

Steaua București
Divizia A: 1996–97
Cupa României: 1996–97

External links
 

1973 births
Living people
Sportspeople from Craiova
Romanian footballers
Association football midfielders
FC U Craiova 1948 players
FC Steaua București players
FC Dinamo București players
AFC Rocar București players
Liaoning F.C. players
Henan Songshan Longmen F.C. players
ASC Oțelul Galați players
Treviso F.B.C. 1993 players
Liga I players
Serie C players
Chinese Super League players
China League One players
Romanian expatriate footballers
Expatriate footballers in Italy
Romanian expatriate sportspeople in Italy
Expatriate footballers in China
S.S. Maceratese 1922 players
Romania international footballers